Liversedge is a town in West Yorkshire.

Liversedge may also refer to:

People 
 Alfred John Liversedge (1854-1934), British engineer, manager, and author
 Harry B. Liversedge (1894–1951), American brigadier general. 
 Ian Liversedge, sports physiotherapist
 Nick Liversedge (born 1988), English footballer
 Sydney Liversedge (1897-1979), British captain, and first world war aviator

Others 
 Liversedge F.C.
 Liversedge RFC